The 2000 Southend-on-Sea Council election took place on 4 May 2000 to elect members of Southend-on-Sea Unitary Council in Essex, England. One third of the council was up for election and the Conservative party gained overall control of the council from no overall control.

After the election, the composition of the council was
Conservative 25
Liberal Democrat 9
Labour 5

Campaign
Before the election the council was run by a coalition between the Liberal Democrat and Labour parties, but the election was expected to see the Conservatives take control from them. 14 of the 39 seats were being contested, with the Conservatives only needing to gain one seat in order to have a majority. They only required a tiny swing to achieve this, which would give the Conservatives control of the council for the first time in 8 years. The election was a high-profile one with the Conservative leader, William Hague, campaigning in the area on the Monday before the election.

A major issue in the election was the number of refugees in the town, which was estimated at up to 2,000. The Conservatives said that the area had become a "dumping ground" and called on all asylum seekers to be detained upon entry into the country. However Labour accused the Conservatives of "playing the race card" and reported a Conservative leaflet to the Commission for Racial Equality.

Other issues included Conservative plans to build a new bypass to ease traffic within the town. Meanwhile, the Liberal Democrat and Labour parties defended their record of investing £50 million in the town during their period in control of the council, while keeping council tax rises down, with the latest council tax level the second lowest in Essex.

Election result
The results saw the Conservatives gain control of the council with an 11-seat majority after winning over 57% of the vote. They gained 3 seats each from both Labour and the Liberal Democrats with defeated councillors including 3 members of the executive, Nigel Baker, Stephen George and Chris Mallam. These defeats meant that Labour failed to hold any of the seats they had been defending, while the Liberal Democrats only managed to hold on to 2 seats. Overall turnout in the election was just above the national average at 30%.

Following the election Charles Latham became the new Conservative leader of the council and announced they would scrap planned bus lanes and abolish charges for social care services.

Ward results

References

2000
2000 English local elections
2000s in Essex